Paul Goodman Changed My Life is a 2011 documentary film directed by Jonathan Lee and distributed by Zeitgeist Films.

Synopsis
Paul Goodman Changed My Life is the first documentary feature about Paul Goodman, social activist, lay psychologist, public intellectual and author best known for Growing Up Absurd. 
The film tells Goodman's story primarily through interviews with his contemporaries, with extensive use of archival footage and personal photographs, as well as readings of his poetry and journals.

References

External links
 
 
 profile on ComingSoon.net
 Zeitgeist Films: Paul Goodman Changed My Life

2011 documentary films
2011 films
American documentary films
Documentary films about writers
Zeitgeist Films films
2010s English-language films
2010s American films